Nagpuri cinema refers to films produced in the Nagpuri language in state of Jharkhand.

History
The first Nagpuri feature film was  Sona Kar Nagpur (1992) which was produced and directed by Dhananjay Nath Tiwari. 

Since then, several films have been produced. Nagpuri cinema faces several challenges such as lack of funds and infrastructure, as most audiences reside in villages. Cinema halls are shutting down in the present day. It is also difficult to release nagpuri films in cinema halls due to the high cost. Despite all these, several films are produced per year and few get released in cinema halls.

Notable films

Notable people

Actor
Dinesh Deva
Raman Gupta
Deepak Lohar
Mukund Nayak
Bunty Singh

Actress
Supriya Kumari

Director
Nandlal Nayak
Lal Vijay Shahdeo

Singer
Monika Mundu

See also 
Khortha cinema
Cinema of Jharkhand

References

Cinema by language of India
Cinema of Jharkhand
Nagpuri language
Nagpuri-language films
Nagpuri culture